Cecco is a given name. Notable people with the name include:

Given name
Cecco Angiolieri (1260–1312), Italian poet
Cecco Bravo (1601–1661), Italian painter of the Florentine Baroque school
Cecco d'Ascoli (1257–1327), Italian encyclopaedist, physician and poet
Cecco del Caravaggio (1610–1620), Baroque artist working in Rome in the 17th century
Cecco di Pietro, artist who lived at Pisa in the 14th century
Cecco II Ordelaffi or Francesco II Ordelaffi (1300–1374), son of Sinibaldo Ordelaffi (died 1337), grandson of Teobaldo I Ordelaffi
Cecco, one of Captain Hook's pirates from Peter Pan

Surname
Raffaele Cecco, (born 1967), British video games developer
Rubén Cecco (born 1983), Argentine football striker

Di Cecco
Alberico di Cecco (born 1974), Italian long-distance and marathon runner
Domenico Di Cecco (footballer), Italian footballer
Domenico di Cecco (painter), 15th-century painter from Gubbio
 Felice Di Cecco (born 1994) Italian footballer
Gregorio di Cecco, Italian painter of the Sienese School during the early Renaissance
John Paul De Cecco, 92, professor at San Francisco State University, pioneer of sexuality studies
Luciano De Cecco (born 1988), Argentinean volleyball player

See also
De Cecco, Italian company producing dried pasta, flour and other related food products
Olavo Cecco Rigon Airport or Concórdia Airport (IATA: CCI, ICAO: SSCK), the airport serving Concórdia, Brazil
Ceccia
Checca (disambiguation)
Chicco
Czecho (disambiguation)